Antony John Phillipson (born 13 January 1971) is a British diplomat, and as of 2021, British High Commissioner to South Africa. He was High Commissioner to Singapore from 2011 to April 2015, and from 2017 to June 2021 was the British Consul-General in New York and Her Majesty's Trade Commissioner for North America.

Career
Phillipson was educated at Marlborough College and Keble College, Oxford. He joined the Civil Service in 1993, working in the then Department of Trade and Industry where he rose to be Principal Private Secretary to the Secretary of State. He then transferred to the Foreign and Commonwealth Office (FCO) and served at Washington, D.C. 2002–04, as the Prime Minister's Private Secretary for Foreign Affairs 2004–07, as head of the Iran Co-ordination Group at the FCO 2007–10, and as High Commissioner to Singapore from 2011 to April 2015 when he was replaced to transfer to another Diplomatic Service appointment. He was Director of Trade and Partnerships in the Department for Exiting the European Union until November 2017, when he was appointed HM Consul General in New York and Director General of International Trade North America.

In addition to his diplomacy-related career, Antony Phillipson is a keen supporter of arts and culture, and was one of the patrons of the British Theatre Playhouse in Singapore from 2011 to 2015.

References
PHILLIPSON, Antony John, Who's Who 2014, A & C Black, 2014 (online edition, Oxford University Press, 2014)
Antony Phillipson, gov.uk

1971 births
Living people
Alumni of Keble College, Oxford
British civil servants
High Commissioners of the United Kingdom to Singapore
People educated at Marlborough College